
Het Jachthuis Hoog Soeren is a defunct restaurant in Hoog Soeren, Apeldoorn in the Netherlands. It was awarded one Michelin star in 1994 and retained that rating until 2001. The restaurant closed in February 2014, when the lease expired. Owner and head chef cited the high rent, the economic crisis and the lack of Michelin star as reasons to quit, as he deemed exploitation not viable under these circumstances.

GaultMillau awarded the restaurant 16.0 out of 20 points.

Head chef of Het Jachthuis Hoog Soeren was Peter-Paul van den Breemen, who took over the restaurant in 2005. Head chef in the Michelin period was Jankees Roggeveen.

See also
List of Michelin starred restaurants in the Netherlands

References 

Restaurants in the Netherlands
Michelin Guide starred restaurants in the Netherlands